Bogston railway station is on the Inverclyde Line, at Bogston in the East end of  Greenock in Inverclyde council area, Scotland.

In past years the station had a goods yard serving the adjacent ship yards and nearby was the Ladyburn locomotive shed (shedplate 66D). The immediately adjacent line from Port Glasgow to  passes Bogston using a railway line positioned at a higher level. However this route has never served Bogston.

Service 
In 2016, there is a daily half-hourly service eastbound to Glasgow Central and westbound to Gourock.  The service drops to hourly each way in the evenings and on Sundays.

References

External links 

Railway stations in Greenock
Former Caledonian Railway stations
Railway stations in Great Britain opened in 1841
Railway stations in Great Britain closed in 1917
Railway stations in Great Britain opened in 1919
SPT railway stations
Railway stations served by ScotRail